The Magnificent Trombone of Curtis Fuller is an album by jazz trombonist Curtis Fuller, released in 1961 on the Epic label.

Reception

Allmusic awarded the album 4 stars with its review by Ken Dryden stating, "the leader doesn't disappoint... While this CD may fall just short of essential for hard bop fans, it is recommended.

Track listing
All compositions by Curtis Fuller except as indicated
 "I'll Be Around" (Alec Wilder) - 3:59  
 "Dream" (Johnny Mercer) - 5:12  
 "Mixed Emotions" (Stuart F. Louchheim) - 4:38  
 "Playpen" - 4:41  
 "Sometimes I Feel Like a Motherless Child" (Traditional) - 3:44  
 "Two Different Worlds" (Al Frisch, Sid Wayne) - 5:54  
 "Teabags" - 4:02  
 "I Loves You, Porgy" (George Gershwin, Ira Gershwin) - 4:29  
Recorded in New York City on February 6 (tracks 2-4, 7 & 8) and February 20 (tracks 1, 5 & 6), 1961

Personnel 
 Curtis Fuller - trombone
 Les Spann - flute, guitar
 Walter Bishop, Jr. - piano
 Buddy Catlett (tracks 2-4, 7 & 8), Jimmy Garrison (tracks 1, 5 & 6) - bass
 Stu Martin - drums

References 

1961 albums
Curtis Fuller albums
Epic Records albums
Albums produced by Mike Berniker